Guioa hospita is a species of plant in the family Sapindaceae. It is endemic to Papua New Guinea.

References

hospita
Endemic flora of Papua New Guinea
Critically endangered plants
Taxonomy articles created by Polbot